Pseudagrion sjoestedti is a species of damselfly in the family Coenagrionidae. It is found in Angola, Benin, Botswana, Cameroon, Central African Republic, the Democratic Republic of the Congo, Ivory Coast, Equatorial Guinea, Gambia, Ghana, Kenya, Liberia, Malawi, Mali, Mozambique, Namibia, Nigeria, Sierra Leone, South Africa, Tanzania, Togo, Uganda, Zambia, Zimbabwe, and possibly Burundi. Its natural habitats are subtropical or tropical moist lowland forests, subtropical or tropical dry shrubland, subtropical or tropical moist shrubland, and rivers.

References

Coenagrionidae
Insects described in 1906
Taxonomy articles created by Polbot